"El cant dels ocells" ('The Song of the Birds') is a traditional Catalan Christmas song and lullaby. It tells of nature's joy at learning of the birth of Jesus Christ in a stable in Bethlehem. The song was made famous outside Catalonia by Pau Casals' instrumental version on the cello. After his exile in 1939, he would begin each of his concerts by playing this song. For this reason, it is often considered a symbol of Catalonia.

Joan Baez included it in her 1966 best selling Christmas LP, dedicating the song to Casals.

In 1991, Catalan tenor Josep Carreras recorded "El cant dels ocells" on his album, José Carreras Sings Catalan Songs. His Three Tenors colleague, Plácido Domingo also recorded the song on his 2014 album, Encanto del Mar.

Lyrics

Recordings 
 Short speech by Pau Casals at the United Nations in October 1971, followed by a separate recording of "El cant dels ocells" YouTube
 Joan Baez "The Carol of The Birds" YouTube
 José Carreras "El cant dels ocells" (Singing with piano accompaniment) YouTube
 Placido Domingo "El cant dels ocells" YouTube

See also
 List of Christmas carols

References

Catalan-language songs
Year of song unknown
Songs about birds
Songwriter unknown